The white-browed spinetail (Hellmayrea gularis) is a species of bird in the ovenbird family Furnariidae. It is the only member of the genus Hellmayrea.

It is found in South America from north-western Venezuela to central Peru. Its natural habitat is subtropical or tropical moist montane forests.

Within the ovenbird family, the white-browed spinetail is genetically most closely related to the thistletails and canasteros in the genus Asthenes.

Four subspecies are recognised:
 H. g. gularis (Lafresnaye, 1843) – Andes of Colombia, Ecuador and north Peru
 H. g. brunneidorsalis (Phelps, WH & Phelps, WH Jr, 1953) – Serranía del Perijá (northeast Colombia and northwest Venezuela)
 H. g. cinereiventris (Chapman, 1912) – Andes of west Venezuela
 H. g. rufiventris (Berlepsch & Stolzmann, 1896) – Andes of north, central Peru

References

white-browed spinetail
Birds of the Northern Andes
white-browed spinetail
Taxonomy articles created by Polbot